Kyongwon Ahn, 9th dan (Kukkiwon), is a South Korean taekwondo master who founded the United Taekwondo Association (UTA) in the United States.

Ahn was born in 1937 in Seoul, Korea, and began training in the martial arts began when he was 12 years old. He served an internship with his instructor, Chang Bok Lee, as the Master Instructor for the South Korean and American armies from 1955 to 1967. In 1962, Ahn achieved his Juris Doctor (Civil Law) from Kangwon University. In August 1967, he emigrated to the US and began teaching tang soo do at the University of Cincinnati in Ohio. He has also held teaching and advisory positions at the Miami University (in Ohio) and Xavier University. Ahn founded the International Martial Arts Federation, now the United Taekwondo Association in 1971 in an effort to standardize taekwondo teaching methods.

Information
In 1974, Ahn was a founding member of the Amateur Athletic Union's Taekwondo Committee. The World Taekwondo Federation (WTF) awarded Ahn his Master Instructor certification in 1977. He received 9th dan ranking from Kukkiwon in 1990. Through the 1980s, Ahn worked within the United States Taekwondo Union (USTU) and ultimately served as the association president USA Taekwondo. He served as a member of the board of directors for the United States Olympic Committee and worked to bring taekwondo to the 1988 and 1992 Summer Olympic Games. In 2000, Ahn was one of the founders of the United States Taekwondo Won (USTW). From 2003 to 2005, he served on the WTF's Legislative Committee. In 2005, the Republic of Korea awarded Ahn the National Sport Merit Award in recognition of his work in promoting taekwondo and helping it to become a full medal Olympic sport.

Major Taekwondo career accomplishments
1967 – Arrived in Cincinnati, OH to establish the martial arts program at the University of Cincinnati and to provide instruction to the R.O.T.C. students
1974 – Founding member of the National AAU Committee
1975 to 1979 – President of the Ohio Taekwondo Association
1977 – Head of the U.S. National Team at the 3rd World Championships held in Chicago, IL
1978 – Author of the promotion standards and code of operation for the National AAU Taekwondo Committee
1980 to 1984 – Vice President of the United States Taekwondo Union
1985 to 1986 – President-elect of the United States Taekwondo Union
1986 – Director of the 1st World Cup Taekwondo event held in Colorado Springs, CO
1986 to 1992 – President of the United States Taekwondo Union
1987 to 1992 – Executive Board Council member of the World Taekwondo Federation
1986 to 1992 – Member of the Board of Directors of the United States Olympic Committee
1988 – Team Leader for the U.S. National Team at the 1st Taekwondo Demonstration at the Olympic Games in Seoul, South Korea
1989 to 1992 – Chairman of the Law & Legislation Committee of the World Taekwondo Federation
1990 – Certified as an International Referee by the World Taekwondo Federation
1990 – Promoted to 9th Dan by the World Taekwondo Federation / Kukkiwon
1992 – Team Leader for the U.S. National Team at the 2nd Taekwondo Demonstration at the Olympic Games in Barcelona, Spain
1992 – Member of the Promotion Committee for the Taekwondo Olympic status
1992 – Member of the Arbitration Committee for the 1992 Barcelona Taekwondo Olympic Games
1995 – President of the Ohio State Taekwondo Association
1999 – Founding member of the United States Taekwondo Won
2001 to 2004 – President of the United States Taekwondo Won
2008–2009 – Member of the Kukkiwon International Advisory Committee

Awards
1977 – Award from Dr. Un Yong Kim for Outstanding Contribution to Taekwondo
1987 – Award from Pan American Games
1992 – Award from the Barcelona Olympic Games
1995 – Award from Dr. Un Yong Kim for Outstanding Contribution to Taekwondo
2002 – National Martial Artist of the Year from the International Tang Soo Do Federation
2003 – National Sport Merit Award from the Republic of Korea

Achievements
One of the founding members of the AAU Taekwondo program
Responsible for establishing the United States Taekwondo Union as the National Governing Body for Olympic Taekwondo
Lobbyist for Taekwondo as an Olympic Sport
Initiator for the World Cup Taekwondo event when President of the United States Taekwondo Union
Founding member of the United States Taekwondo Won
Has taught Taekwondo from 1957 through 2011 (1957 to 1967 in Korea) (1967 to current in the United States)

Senior students 
As an instructor Ahn is responsible for teaching and promoting thousands of under black belt students, hundreds of black belts and several master instructors and five Grandmaster Instructors - Grandmaster August K. Oneal, Grandmaster Kim Limes, Grandmaster Ron Hickey, Grandmaster James Beasley, Grandmaster Robert K. Fujimura (former executive director of the US Taekwondo Union/now USA Taekwondo) and Grandmaster Chuck Beyersdoerfer. These masters and students made their mark as Taekwondo instructors, International Referees, state and national champions and successful business leaders in many fields. He also sponsored other Korean instructors when they first came to the United States of America. Noted as much for his patience and kindness toward students as he is his ever-demanding standards of perfection within the study of Taekwondo, Ahn is known as a beloved mentor to thousands of who have learned under his instruction over the last half-century.

See also
 List of taekwondo grandmasters

References

External links
 Ahn Taekwondo Institute

1937 births
Living people
Martial arts school founders
Miami University faculty
South Korean emigrants to the United States
Sportspeople from Seoul